Dean railway station, also shown as Dean (Wilts), serves the village of West Dean in Wiltshire, England. Whilst the station building is in Wiltshire, the platforms straddle the county boundary with Hampshire.

South Western Railway (SWR) operates a regular service between Salisbury and Southampton Central via Romsey. This runs hourly during the week, with a two-hourly service on Sundays, and uses two-car Class 158 units. As a result of the introduction of the SWR service, the number of Great Western Railway (GWR) trains between Portsmouth Harbour and Cardiff that stop at Dean was reduced. Since October 2011, there have been no GWR trains stopping at Dean, and from April 2020 the management of the station was transferred from GWR to SWR.

Gallery

References

External links

Former London and South Western Railway stations
Railway stations in Hampshire
Railway stations in Wiltshire
Railway stations in Great Britain opened in 1847
Railway stations served by South Western Railway
1847 establishments in England
DfT Category F2 stations